Jane Comerford (born 1 January 1959 in Newcastle, Australia) is a singer, songwriter, lecturer, and vocal coach working in Germany.

Education
Jane has an extensive musical and music-related education. She studied violin and piano for 12 years, and later music theory, and graduated from Newcastle Conservatorium (where she was awarded her A.Mus.A. diploma). She had six years of classical ballet training in Newcastle as well as jazz dance training in Los Angeles. Further, she went on to study singing in Hamburg, Vienna and Amsterdam, as well as learned to play ukulele.

Career as singer

From Australia via America to Europe
Having studied piano and violin in Newcastle, Jane was no longer sure whether the classical style still fulfilled her expectations. She went to the United States where she worked as pianist in several night clubs. A holiday in Spain made her stay in Europe.

After she discovered that life in Spain still did not meet her expectations she moved to Hamburg where she worked again as pianist in the bar of the hotel "Intercontinental". There she started to work with several bands and gained more and more experience in the sound studio. She wrote and composed songs, worked in her husband's studio and became popular as a background singer. In addition to that she started to teach at the Hochschule für Musik und Theater in Hamburg.

Through a friend Jane was given the opportunity to attend a two-week-long Musical Course (taught by Buenaventura Braunstein). There she met the director Markus Weber who wanted to have her in several of his productions. She played the leading roles Eponine in Les Misérables (in Vienna), Roxie Hart in Chicago (in Dortmund) and Marilyn/Sue in Markus Weber's own musical M wie Marilyn (in Hamburg). Other roles include Angel in The Rink (in Bielefeld) and Dot/Marie in Sunday in the Park with George (in Kaiserslautern).

In 1983 she released a Hi NRG cover version of "In the Year 2525" under the pseudonym "Jane Rossi".

In 1998 she released her debut album Somebody Sent Me an Angel with a collection of her own songs under the Polydor (Universal Music) label. Apart from live performances, Jane is also an accomplished studio singer, songwriter and producer, running her own recording studio.

With Texas Lightning to the Eurovision Song Contest

In 2005, Jane joined Texas Lightning, a Hamburg-based German country music-inspired band as lead singer. They released the single Like a Virgin (cover of Madonna's song), as well as an album called Meanwhile, Back at The Ranch, consisting mainly of country-flavoured covers of popular rock and pop hits.

In 2006, Texas Lightning, along with Vicky Leandros and Thomas Anders, was nominated by the German public broadcaster NDR to enter the Vorentscheid 2006 (German preselection for the Eurovision Song Contest 2006, which actually took place in Hamburg). Their entry was a typical country song No no never, written and composed by Jane Comerford. It came as a clear favorite with the viewers during the voting, and consequently Texas Lightning went on to represent Germany in the ESC. As Germany is one of the four biggest contributors to the EBU (organiser of the contest), their entries go straight to the final. On the final night, Texas Lightning came 14th, with 36 points, but the song had already reached no. 1 in the German charts.

Teaching and coach
Since 1984, Jane Comerford has been teaching the Popkurs at the Hochschule für Musik und Theater Hamburg. Within that education program for popular music, she teaches singing, songwriting, performance, and composition. She also provides coaching to artists and bands on an individual basis. Among her former students are Wir sind Helden, Die Happy, Cultured Pearls, Seeed, Rosenstolz, Lemonbabies, Fury in the Slaughterhouse and Cucumber Men. Other personalities she provided coaching for include Yvonne Catterfeld, Blümchen, Eva Herman, Bettina Tietjen, Katja Riemann and Uwe Ochsenknecht.

Jane Comerford also worked as a singing and performance coach for the contestants in the 2003 German version of the TV show Fame Academy on RTL II. This involved daily work with them for three consecutive months.

Since June 2007 Jane has worked as a judge and coach on the sixth season of the German Popstars show.

See also
 Texas Lightning
 Germany in the Eurovision Song Contest 2006
 Eurovision Song Contest 2006

References

External links

 

1959 births
Living people
Australian country singer-songwriters
Australian expatriates in Germany
Australian women singer-songwriters
Eurovision Song Contest entrants for Germany
Eurovision Song Contest entrants of 2006
People from Newcastle, New South Wales